Joseph H. Loveland (1859–1938) was a member of the Vermont House of Representatives and Vermont Senate.

Biography
Loveland was born on March 10, 1859, in Wauwatosa, Wisconsin, into the Congregationalist family of Aaron Loveland and Laura Goodell. In 1866, his family moved back to his father's hometown of Norwich, Vermont. Loveland married Emma Healy (1865–1945) of Newark, New Jersey. He died in Norwich on October 20, 1938, at the age of 79.

Career
Loveland was a member of the House of Representatives from 1923 to 1925 and of the Senate in 1927.

References

1859 births
1938 deaths
Members of the Vermont House of Representatives
People from Norwich, Vermont
People from Wauwatosa, Wisconsin
Vermont state senators